Men's Giant Slalom World Cup 1990/1991

Calendar

Final point standings

In Men's Giant Slalom World Cup 1990/91 all results count.

Men's Giant Slalom Team Results

bold indicate highest score - italics indicate race wins

References
 fis-ski.com

World Cup
FIS Alpine Ski World Cup men's giant slalom discipline titles